Peter the Byzantine (fl. 1770 – 1808), also known as Petros Byzantios (Greek: Πέτρος Βυζάντιος), and "the Fugitive", was a Greek composer and scribe. A pupil of Peter the Peloponnesian, he served the Ecumenical Patriarchate of Constantinople as Domestikos (c. 1771–1789), Lambadarios (1789–1800), and Arch-cantor (1800–1805).

Biography 

Peter the Byzantine was born near Constantinople in Yeniköy of Bosphorus. There, he began studying music and quickly became a virtuoso of the pandouris and the Arabian flageolet (ney). Peter rose to a number of prominent positions in the Ecumenical Patriarchate of Constantinople, known at that time as the "Great Church of Christ," culminating in his appointment as Arch-cantor in 1800. However, he was sacked by Patriarch Callinicus V of Constantinople in 1805, due to his second marriage, which was not allowed for a cantor. Peter fled to Kherson, hence his name "the Fugitive", and from there to Iași, where he lived until his death in 1808.

Music 
Alongside his teaching role, Peter was known for his contributions to the field of chanting, both as a composer and in his explanations of old chantings. He completed both known books of Peter the Peloponnesian, the Anastasimatarion, composing the missing Kekragaria with the incidental Stichologia, and the Heirmologion of Katavasies, adding Heirmoses standards for several holidays. He also pointed at the outset the Short Anastasimatarion and most importantly, for the first time, the Short Heirmologion. He composed many chantings of Priests' Art (Greek: Παπαδική), such as the Κοινωνικά των Kυριακών (three stops) and some of the Ενιαυτός, eight Cherubic Hymns in all modes, Doxologies, two Theotokia, eight Timioteres (Greek: Τιμιωτέρες) for all modes, the Νεκρώσιμος Άμωμος, and some others. His compositions are distinguished by their simplicity and frugality, and he sang his chants, as noted by Chrysanthos of Madytos: "with orderliness, concern, and the appropriate pace of chanting."

Manuscripts 
Peter the Byzantine copied and expounded many manuscripts. His detailed explanations followed the notation system of Peter the Peloponnesian, simplifying them for contemporary use. He was able to explain many chantings, both older and more recent, including:
 Άνωθεν οι προφήται (grave mode) by John Kukuzelis
 Tη υπερμάχω (plagal of 4th mode) by John Kladas
 Θεοτόκε Παρθένε (octoechos) by Petros Bereketis

Many of his works have been preserved. Some are dated between the years 1773–1806, while others are undated. There are also multiple copies of his copies of the works of Peter the Peloponnesian, as well as numerous anthologies of Priests' New Art (Greek: Νέα Παπαδική).

Works 
 Heirmologion by Peter the Peloponnesian
 Short Heirmologion
 Anastasimatarion by Peter the Peloponnesian
 Short Anastasimatarion
 Doxastarion by Peter the Peloponnesian
 Doxastarion by Jacob the Arch-cantor

Contribution 
Due to this teaching and his work in the area of chanting, as well and his copying and explanations of older works, Peter the Byzantine remains one of the most important musicians in the second great period of prosperity (1770–1820) of the new church chanting.

References

External links 
 
 

Byzantine composers
Composers from the Ottoman Empire
Greeks from the Ottoman Empire
Greek composers
Greek musicians
Eastern Orthodox liturgical music
1808 deaths
Year of birth unknown
Male classical composers
1770 births
18th-century Greek musicians
19th-century Greek musicians
19th-century Greek educators
18th-century Greek educators
19th-century Greek writers
18th-century Greek writers
19th-century male musicians
Constantinopolitan Greeks
Musicians from Istanbul
People from Sarıyer